Pascal Cardinal (born ) is a Canadian male volleyball player. He was part of the Canada men's national volleyball team at the 2006 FIVB Volleyball Men's World Championship in Japan. He played CIS volleyball for the Alberta Golden Bears where he was a member of the CIS National Championship team in 2002 and was named the CIS Men's Volleyball Player of the Year in 2003, his fifth and final year with the program.

References

1979 births
Alberta Golden Bears volleyball players
Canadian men's volleyball players
Living people